Far Out is a British online culture magazine, headquartered in London and founded in 2010. Far Out focuses on independent and alternative culture, reviewing music, films and the arts along with relative interviews and curated playlists.

History
Far Out was founded in 2010 by Lee Thomas-Mason, then a student of Leeds Metropolitan University. Shortly after, Jack Whatley became an editor of the website as both pushed the content into new directions. Lee Thomas-Mason had  previously worked as a sports reporter at Sky Sports, The Mirror and Metro.

While first focusing on unsigned artists and independent music venues with a Gonzo journalism approach, Far Out expanded into coverage of cinema in 2013 and, subsequently, included curated travel, arts and photography sections.

In 2017 Far Out Magazine partnered with suicide prevention charity CALM. In 2021, Far Out also confirmed a media partnership with the British Film Institute (BFI), focusing on the work of Hong Kong film director Wong Kar-wai.

Far Out was the panelist for the Tramlines apply to play 2022.

References

2010 establishments in the United Kingdom
English-language magazines
Magazines established in 2010
Monthly magazines published in the United Kingdom
Cultural magazines published in the United Kingdom
Magazines published in London
Online music magazines published in the United Kingdom